The Green Power Forum was an English group created by companies in the renewable energy sector to assist organisations and businesses in becoming more energy efficient.

Organisation
The Green Power Forum hosts conferences aiming to advise on the financial benefits of renewable technologies, government legislation, products, and technologies. Delegates attend from sectors including construction, facilities managers, energy managers, engineers and architects. The first conference was held in Liverpool in October 2009.

The chairman of GPF is Mark McManus, the managing director of heat pump specialist Stiebel Eltron UK. Other members of the Green Power Board include North West Energy Support Agency, Envirolink Northwest, underfloor heating supplier Nu-Heat, sustainable energy consultants and installers ISO Energy UK and Liverpool Chamber of Commerce.

References

Renewable energy in England